A Sun Came! is the debut album by American singer-songwriter Sufjan Stevens, released in 1999 on Asthmatic Kitty. It was reissued four years later. Among Stevens' back catalog, A Sun Came is notable for being recorded on four-track.

Thematic elements
As noted in AllMusic review of the album, the album explores many types of ethnic music from throughout the globe, ranging from Celtic, Indian, Middle Eastern, Moroccan, Far Eastern and American folk music. The record as a whole was dubbed indie folk, indie rock, Celtic rock, alternative rock, and lo-fi by different professional music critics.

Stevens himself has described the album's sound as incorporating "traditional pop music, medieval instrumentation with Middle Eastern inflections, tape loops, digital samples, literary vocals, manic percussion, woodwinds, sitar, amp distortion and Arabic chants."

Like many Stevens's albums that would follow, A Sun Came features a multitude of instruments ranging from banjo, sitar, oboe and xylophone. In total the album features Stevens playing fourteen instruments.

Recording
Stevens originally recorded the bulk of the album in Holland, Michigan in 1998, with some post-editing performed at Hope College Recording Arts Center—the short track "Godzuki" was written by his siblings in 1981 and recorded by their stepfather Lowell Brams. "Joy! Joy! Joy!" was recorded for the 2001 re-release and "Rake (Greenpoint Version)"—a reworking of "Rake"—was recorded for the 2004 re-release.

Track listing

Personnel
Sufjan Stevens – oboe, English horn, piano, electric organ, electric piano, banjo, acoustic and electric guitar, bass guitar, vibraphone, xylophone, glockenspiel, recorders, wood flute and whistles, drum kit, percussion, shakers, sleigh bells, tambourine, cymbal, singing, layout, art design, arrangement, mixing, production
John Baker at Maja Audio Group – remastering (2004 edition)
Stephen Halker – paintings
Katrina Kerns – vocals on "Rake (Greenpoint version)"
Jesse Koskey – drum beats on "Rice Pudding" and "A Loverless Bed (Without Remission)"
Leah Michaelson – photography
Matt Morgan – guitar solo on "Demetrius" and "The Oracle Said Wander"
Megan Smith – vocals on "Rake (Greenpoint version)"
Shannon Stephens – vocals on "A Winner Needs a Wand"
Djohariah Stevens – performance on "Godzuki"
Marzuki Stevens – guitar on "A Loverless Bed (Without Remission)", percussion on "Super Sexy Woman", tenor saxophone on "Satan's Saxophones", and performance on "Godzuki"
Ghadeer Yasser – vocals on "Demetrius" and "Ya Leil"

References

1999 debut albums
Albums produced by Sufjan Stevens
Asthmatic Kitty albums
Sounds Familyre Records albums
Sufjan Stevens albums